; born 28 June 1909) was a Japanese high jumper who won silver medals at the 1927, 1930 and 1934 Far Eastern Championship Games, losing to Simeon Toribio on all occasions. He placed sixth at the 1928 and 1932 Summer Olympics.

References

External links
 

1909 births
Date of death missing
Japanese male high jumpers
Olympic male high jumpers
Olympic athletes of Japan
Athletes (track and field) at the 1928 Summer Olympics
Athletes (track and field) at the 1932 Summer Olympics
Japan Championships in Athletics winners
20th-century Japanese people